Manduca reducta is a moth of the  family Sphingidae. It is known from Peru and Bolivia.

There are probably multiple generations per year.

References

Manduca
Moths described in 1930